The 1992–93 Australian region cyclone season was a below average Australian cyclone season. It was also an event in the ongoing cycle of tropical cyclone formation. It ran from 1 November 1992 to 30 April 1993. The regional tropical cyclone operational plan also defines a tropical cyclone year separately from a tropical cyclone season, and the "tropical cyclone year" ran from 1 July 1992 to 30 June 1993.

Tropical cyclones in this area were monitored by four Tropical Cyclone Warning Centres (TCWCs): the Australian Bureau of Meteorology in Perth, Darwin, and Brisbane; and TCWC Port Moresby in Papua New Guinea.

Seasonal summary

Systems

Tropical Cyclone Ken

Tropical Cyclone Ken existed from 17 December to 23 December.

Severe Tropical Cyclone Nina

Nina formed on December 21, 1992, the storm reached Category 1 status before making landfall in northern Queensland, then Nina moved eastward, reaching Category 3 status before becoming an extratropical cyclone on January 4, 1993.

Tropical Cyclone Lena

Tropical Cyclone Lena existed from 22 January to 2 February.

Severe Tropical Cyclone Oliver

Severe Tropical Cyclone Oliver existed from 3 February to 14 February.

Severe Tropical Cyclone Polly

Developed in the Coral sea far offshore from Queensland. The cyclone intensified to a Category 3 severe tropical cyclone before crossing out of Australian region on 1 March where it passed to the southwest of New Caledonia.

Tropical Cyclone Roger

Tropical Cyclone Roger peaked as a category 2 cyclone on March 15. On March 20, Roger exited the Australian region into the South Pacific.

Tropical Cyclone Monty

Tropical Cyclone Monty existed from 6 April to 15 April.

Severe Tropical Cyclone Adel

Adel lasted from 11–16 May 1993. During its life, it passed over Bougainville Island and near Goodenough Island, leaving two drowned and a total of at least 15 missing. Leaves were blown from trees, and 345 houses were destroyed, along with a radio tower that was bent over. The track, especially its intensity and formation area, are highly unusual as a tropical cyclone in this region (the north coast of Papua New Guinea) has occurred less than 10 times in history.

Season Effects

|-
| Ken ||  || bgcolor=#|Category 1 tropical cyclone || bgcolor=#| || bgcolor=#| || Cocos Island ||  ||  ||
|-
| Nina ||  || bgcolor=#|Category 3 severe tropical cyclone || bgcolor=#||| bgcolor=#| || Queensland, Solomon IslandsRotuma, Wallis and Futuna, Tuvalu, Tonga, Niue || None || None || None ||
|-
| Lena ||  || bgcolor=#|Category 2 tropical cyclone || bgcolor=#| || bgcolor=#| || None ||  ||  ||
|-
| Oliver ||  || bgcolor=#|Category 4 severe tropical cyclone || bgcolor=#||| bgcolor=#| || Queensland ||  || 
|-
| Polly ||  || bgcolor=#|Category 3 severe tropical cyclone || bgcolor=#||| bgcolor=#| || None ||  ||  ||
|-
| Roger ||  || bgcolor=#|Category 2 tropical cyclone || bgcolor=#| || bgcolor=#| || None || None || None || None ||
|-
| Monty ||  || bgcolor=#|Category 2 tropical cyclone || bgcolor=#| || bgcolor=#| || None ||  ||  ||
|-
| Adel ||  || bgcolor=#|Category 3 severe tropical cyclone || bgcolor=#| || bgcolor=#| || Papua New Guinea || Minimal || 3 ||
|-

See also

 List of Southern Hemisphere tropical cyclone seasons
 Atlantic hurricane seasons: 1992, 1993
 Pacific hurricane seasons: 1992, 1993
 Pacific typhoon seasons: 1992, 1993
North Indian Ocean cyclone seasons: 1992, 1993

References

 
Australian region cyclone seasons